The 1978 Lafayette Leopards football team was an American football team that represented Lafayette College as an independent during the 1978 NCAA Division I-AA football season.

In their eighth year under head coach Neil Putnam, the Leopards compiled a 4–7 record. Jim Medes and Brian Musician were the team captains.

This was the first year of competition for Division I-AA, later to be renamed the Football Championship Subdivision. Lafayette, along with its in-state rivals Bucknell and Lehigh, moved up to I-AA after having previously competed as independents in NCAA Division II. The Leopards' 1978 schedule included opponents from Division I-A, Division I-AA, Division II and Division III.

Lafayette played its home games at Fisher Field on College Hill in Easton, Pennsylvania.

Schedule

References

Lafayette
Lafayette Leopards football seasons
Lafayette Leopards football